NGC 180 is a barred spiral galaxy located in the constellation Pisces. It was discovered on December 29, 1790 by William Herschel.

A peculiar type II supernova was discovered in the galaxy in 2001 and given the designation SN 2001dj.

See also  
 Spiral galaxy 
 List of NGC objects (1–1000)
 Pisces (constellation)

References

External links 
 
 
 SEDS

0180
00380
Barred spiral galaxies
Pisces (constellation)
Astronomical objects discovered in 1790
+01-02-039
002268